Willowdale, also known as Smith Place, Gunther Farm, and Willow Dale, is a historic home located at Painter, Accomack County, Virginia. It is a two-story, five-bay, gambrel roofed, frame dwelling with brick ends.  There is a two-bay, single story extension that provides service from a -story kitchen with a large brick cooking fireplace at the south end.  The wing dates to the early-19th century.  The main block is an expansion of a 17th-century patent house of  stories that now forms the parlor at the north end of the main block. The house is representative of the vernacular "big house, little house, colonnade, kitchen" style that was common in colonial homes on the Eastern Shore of Virginia.  Also on the property are the contributing ruins of a barn.  Willowdale is one of the few remaining examples of the dwelling of an early colonial settler, landowner and farmer. The Smith family  remained owners of Willowdale from 1666 until 2018.

It was added to the National Register of Historic Places in 2007.

References

Houses on the National Register of Historic Places in Virginia
Houses completed in 1666
National Register of Historic Places in Accomack County, Virginia
Houses in Accomack County, Virginia
1666 establishments in Virginia